Jowzdan Communal Housing ( – Mojmūʿeh Gorvehhā’ Mashāʿ-ye Jowzdān) is a village in Jowzdan Rural District, in the Central District of Najafabad County, Isfahan Province, Iran. At the 2006 census, its population was 22, in 10 families.

References 

Populated places in Najafabad County